Zgornji Petelinjek (in older sources also Gornji Petelinjek) is a small settlement in the Municipality of Lukovica in the eastern part of the Upper Carniola region of Slovenia. It lies on the main road from Ljubljana to Celje.

References

External links
 
Zgornji Petelinjek on Geopedia

Populated places in the Municipality of Lukovica